"Hurt Me Tomorrow" is a song by Somali-Canadian artist K'naan from his fourth studio album Country, God or the Girl. It was released as a digital download on 1 May 2012. The song was written by Ryan Tedder, Evan Bogart, Noel Zancanella and K'naan himself. The song was featured in the 2014 film Neighbors.

Track listing

Credits and personnel
Lead vocals – K'naan
Lyrics – Ryan Tedder, Evan Bogart, Noel Zancanella, Keinan Warsame
Label: A&M/Octone Records
Engineer - Smith Carlson

Chart performance

Weekly charts

Year-end charts

Certifications

Release history

References

2012 singles
2012 songs
A&M Records singles
K'naan songs
Song recordings produced by Ryan Tedder
Songs written by Ryan Tedder
Songs written by E. Kidd Bogart
Songs written by Noel Zancanella
Songs written by K'naan